2010 Fagiano Okayama season

Competitions

Player statistics

Other pages
 J. League official site

Fagiano Okayama
Fagiano Okayama seasons